Schroeder Amplification, Inc. is a manufacturer of handwired guitar tube amplifiers and effects. They are located in Highland Park, Illinois, and owned by Tim Schroeder.

Critical reception
Premier Guitar awarded Schroeder Amplifiers' DB7, DB9, SA9 a 5-star review and praised the amplifier, calling it "an instant classic" and that the amp makes "the plainest of sonorities a thing of wonder".

Guitarist Nels Cline uses the Schroeder DB7, DB9, SA9.
Andrew Bird also uses two red custom-built Schroeder amplifiers.

Products
 Schroeder DB7, DB9, SA9 - all tube guitar amplifier
 Schroeder Dozer
 Schroeder Formula 50 Head
 Schroeder Sidecar - 2x12 speaker cabinet
 Schroeder Small Block Speaker Cabinet
 Schroeder "IT" - FET-based clean boost/buffer
 Schroeder Blister Agent - distortion pedal

References

External links
 

Guitar amplifier manufacturers
Audio equipment manufacturers of the United States